Marco Tardelli (born 24 September 1954) is an Italian former football player and manager. At club level, he played as a midfielder for several Italian clubs; he began his career with Pisa, and later played for Como, Juventus, and Internazionale, before retiring with Swiss club St. Gallen. He enjoyed a highly successful career with Juventus, winning five league titles, as well as multiple Coppa Italia titles, and four major UEFA competitions (European Cup, Cup Winner's Cup, UEFA Cup and UEFA Super Cup), becoming one of the first three players ever to win all three major UEFA club competitions, along with Italy and Juventus teammates Antonio Cabrini and Gaetano Scirea.

Tardelli also achieved success with the Italy national team. He represented his nation at a total of three FIFA World Cups (1978, 1982 and 1986), winning the 1982 edition of the tournament. His goal celebration in the 1982 final – where he ran away shaking his fists, tears pouring down his face, screaming "Gol! Gol!" as he shook his head wildly – is regarded as one of the most iconic moments in World Cup history. He also took part at UEFA Euro 1980, in which he came fourth on home soil, and was named to the team of the tournament.

Regarded as one of Italy's greatest midfielders, and one of the best players of his generation, Tardelli was an energetic and hard-tackling yet technically skilful two-way midfielder, who was known for his ability to contribute both offensively and defensively. In 2004, Tardelli was named 37th in the UEFA Golden Jubilee Poll; he was inducted into the Italian Football Hall of Fame in 2015.

As a manager, Tardelli initially worked with the Italy U-16 side, and later served as an assistant manager to Cesare Maldini for the U-21 side. He subsequently led several clubs in Italy before serving as head coach of the Italy national under-21 football team, winning the 1997 Mediterranean Games and the 2000 UEFA European Under-21 Football Championship, before returning to coach at club level. Between 2004 and 2005 he also managed the Egypt national football team, while he served as an assistant manager to Giovanni Trapattoni with the Republic of Ireland national football team between 2008 and 2013.

Club career
Tardelli was born at Capanne di Careggine, in the province of Lucca (Tuscany).
He started his career in the Italian Serie C with the club of Pisa in 1972. Two years later he played in the Serie B with Como before joining Serie A giants Juventus the next year, in October 1975.

During his decade-long stint at the Turin club, he enjoyed much success, as he became one of the first three players ever to win all the three major European competitions, alongside teammates Antonio Cabrini and Gaetano Scirea: the UEFA Cup in 1977, the Cup Winners' Cup in 1984, and the European Cup in 1985. With Juventus, he also won five Italian Serie A championships, and two Coppa Italia titles, as well as the 1984 European Super Cup.

He scored the decisive goal during the first leg of the 1977 UEFA Cup final against Athletic Bilbao, which allowed him and Juventus to win their first ever European title.

In total, Tardelli played 376 games with Juventus and scored 51 goals. He left the Turin club in 1985, moving on to rivals Internazionale, where he remained until 1987, before ending his career in 1988, after a season with Swiss side St. Gallen.

International career

Tardelli made his international debut on 7 April 1976 against Portugal. He played at the 1978 World Cup and the 1980 European Football Championship on home soil, reaching the semi-final and earning fourth-place finishes in both tournaments, and being named as a member of the team of the tournament at Euro 80. He performed especially well during Italy's 1982 World Cup-winning campaign, scoring twice. His first came in a second-round group stage win against Argentina, and his memorable second goal of the tournament was scored in the final against West Germany, with a left footed strike from outside the area. With tears in his eyes, he ran towards the Italian bench, fists clenched in front of his chest, screaming "Gol! Gol!" as he shook his head wildly. This celebration has been called the "Tardelli cry", and was considered one of the defining images of Italy's 1982 World Cup triumph; Tardelli later reflected:

 
In 2014, his iconic 1982 FIFA World Cup Final goal celebration was named the fourth greatest World Cup moment of all time by the BBC. He won a total of 81 caps for Italy, playing his final game for them against Norway in September 1985, and also served as Italy's captain between 1983 and 1985. He was part of the squad for 1986 FIFA World Cup, but did not play. He retired as a player in 1988.

Style of play

During an era when Italy was known for its defensive prowess (catenaccio), Tardelli made his name as a hard-tackling yet technically skilful and elegant defensive midfielder, with an ability to get forward and contribute offensively; a well-rounded footballer, he was regarded as one of the finest midfielders in the world during the early 1980s. A quick, tenacious, and energetic player, with good feet, he is regarded as one of the greatest Italian midfielders of all time, and was a two-way midfielder who was known for his tactical intelligence, versatility and work-rate as a footballer, which enabled him to play anywhere in midfield. Although he was usually deployed in the centre in a more offensive midfield role, in particular under managers Giovanni Trapattoni and Enzo Bearzot, with Juventus and Italy respectively (known in Italian as the "mezzala" position), he also played in several other positions throughout his career, and was capable of playing as a winger on either flank, or even as a defender; indeed in his early career, he played as a full-back on either side of the pitch, and also as a centre-back (or "stopper" in Italian), due to his man-marking skills and ball-winning abilities. Although Tardelli was mainly renowned for his speed, stamina and defensive skills, he also possessed a powerful shot, and was capable of striking and passing the ball with either foot, despite being naturally right footed. Due to his great pace and slender build, Tardelli's Juventus teammate Luciano Spinosi gave him the nickname Schizzo. In addition to his footballing abilities, he was also stood out for his leadership throughout his career, and was known for being a decisive player. In 2007, The Times placed Tardelli at number 10 in their list of the 50 hardest footballers in history. Jonathan Wilson, when writing for The Guardian in 2013, labelled Tardelli as a type of holding midfielder he described as a "destroyer," a player who is primarily tasked with running, winning back possession, and distributing the ball to other players.

Coaching career
Tardelli started his managing career as head coach of the Under 16 Italy national team in 1988, immediately after his retirement. Two years later, he became the assistant coach of Cesare Maldini for the Under 21 team. In 1993, he switched to Como of Serie C1. He led Como to promotion into Serie B, but was unable to avoid relegation.

In 1995, he took over Cesena, another Serie B team. Tardelli would spend three seasons with Cesena before leaving to become head coach of the Italian Under 21 team. He won the Under 21 European Championship, the following year, and also coached the Italian side which took part at the 2000 Summer Olympics, reaching the quarter-finals. His success with the Italian Under 21 side led Tardelli to become the manager of Internazionale for the 2000–01 season. His tenure with the Nerazzurri would be short; following a string of embarrassing defeats especially a 6–0 defeat to local rivals A.C. Milan, Tardelli was fired in June 2001. Tardelli did not have much luck in the coaching jobs that followed, which included spells with Bari, the Egyptian national team and Arezzo.

Tardelli served for a short time as part of the administrative council of his former club Juventus in 2006, before resigning in 2007 allegedly due to differences with the hierarchy regarding the direction the club was heading towards. In February 2008, he joined the coaching staff of the Republic of Ireland national team as an assistant manager to the recently appointed Giovanni Trapattoni. He was reunited with former Juventus teammate Liam Brady, who was also named as Trapattoni's assistant.

Tardelli parted ways with the Republic of Ireland national team on 11 September 2013 by mutual consent, after a defeat by Austria the previous day.

Personal life
Tardelli was one of over 80 Italian celebrities to sign a petition in favour of the 2016 referendum on constitutional reform.

Career statistics

Club

International

Manager

Honours

Player
Juventus
 Serie A: 1976–77, 1977–78, 1980–81, 1981–82, 1983–84
 Coppa Italia: 1978–79, 1982–83
 European Cup: 1984–85
 UEFA Cup: 1976–77
 UEFA Cup Winners' Cup: 1983–84
 UEFA Super Cup: 1984

Italy
 FIFA World Cup: 1982

Individual
 UEFA Golden Jubilee Poll: #37
 FIFA XI: 1979
 UEFA European Championship Team of the Tournament: 1980
 Italian Football Hall of Fame: 2015

Coach
Italy under-21
 Mediterranean Games: 1997
 UEFA European Under-21 Championship: 2000

See also
 List of players to have won the three main European club competitions

References

External links

  

1954 births
Living people
Sportspeople from the Province of Lucca
Pisa S.C. players
Como 1907 players
Inter Milan players
Italian football managers
Italian footballers
Italy international footballers
Juventus F.C. players
Serie A players
Serie B players
Serie C players
Swiss Super League players
Egypt national football team managers
Como 1907 managers
A.C. Cesena managers
Inter Milan managers
S.S.C. Bari managers
S.S. Arezzo managers
Serie A managers
FIFA World Cup-winning players
1978 FIFA World Cup players
1982 FIFA World Cup players
1986 FIFA World Cup players
UEFA Euro 1980 players
FC St. Gallen players
Italian expatriate footballers
Italian expatriate sportspeople in Switzerland
Italian expatriate football managers
Association football midfielders
UEFA Cup winning players
Italian expatriate sportspeople in Egypt
Italian expatriate sportspeople in Ireland
Expatriate football managers in Egypt